Castel Manfrino (Italian for Manfrino Castle)  is a Middle Ages castle in Valle Castellana, Province of Teramo (Abruzzo).

History

Architecture

References

External links

Manfrino
Valle Castellana